Wesley Gibbs (July 24, 1842 - May 29, 1917) was an American soldier who fought in the American Civil War. Gibbs received his country's highest award for bravery during combat, the Medal of Honor. Gibbs's medal was won for his capturing the flag during the Third Battle of Petersburg on April 2, 1865. He was honored with the award on May 10, 1865. Following his Medal of Honor his rank was subsequently reduced to Private, for reasons unknown.

Gibbs was born in Sharon, Connecticut. He joined the Army from Salisbury, Connecticut in August 1862, and mustered out with his regiment in August 1865. Gifford was buried in Winsted, Connecticut, at Forest View Cemetery.

Medal of Honor citation

See also
List of American Civil War Medal of Honor recipients: G–L

References

1842 births
1917 deaths
American Civil War recipients of the Medal of Honor
People from Sharon, Connecticut
People of Connecticut in the American Civil War
Union Army officers
United States Army Medal of Honor recipients
Military personnel from Connecticut